Asanoa is a Gram-positive, aerobic, mesophilic and non-motile genus of bacteria from the family Micromonosporaceae. Asanoa is named after the Japanese microbiologist Kozo Asano.

References

Further reading 
 

Micromonosporaceae
Bacteria genera